The 1997–98 season was the 99th completed season in the history of Walsall Football Club, the clubs 78th season in the Football League and third consecutive season in the Football League Second Division. In addition to the league, Walsall also participated in the FA Cup, League Cup and Football League Trophy.

Season summary
The Saddlers finished in the top half of the Second Division in the previous two seasons under Chris Nicholl's management, however, he quit in May 1997 citing family reasons. After Nicholl's departure, Walsall turned to former Denmark international Jan Sørensen who became Walsall's first, and to date only, ever manager from continental Europe.

Sørensen attracted some exciting foreign talent to Walsall, bringing in former Ligue 1 top goalscorer Roger Boli and his compatriot Jean-François Péron, who quickly became fans' favourites.

Whilst Walsall finished a lowly 19th in the Second Division, the club reached the fourth round of the League Cup, fourth round of the FA Cup and the Southern Area Final of the Football League Trophy, being just ten minutes away from a first ever appearance at Wembley Stadium.

However, despite the club's cup exploits, a poor finish in the league signalled the end of Sørensen's time at Walsall after just one season.

Final league table

Results
Walsall's score comes first

Legend

Football League Second Division

FA Cup

League Cup

Football League Trophy

Squad

References

Walsall F.C. seasons
Walsall